Francis William Russell (3 June 1800 – 30 August 1871) was the Liberal MP for Limerick City  from 1852  until his death.

He was the son of John Norris Russell a Limerick merchant and miller, and brother of Richard Russell, who died one day before him in Limerick. He was educated at Trinity College, Dublin and entered the Irish Bar in 1824.

In 1834 he married Frances Clarke from Melton Mowbray; his son, John Thomas Norreys Russell, was a barrister on the South Eastern Circuit and later a JP for Leicestershire; and his grandson, Francis Deane Russell, had a distinguished career in the Indian Army.

Following the death of Francis in 1871, his position in the parliament was filled by Issac Butt.

References

1800 births
1871 deaths
Members of the Parliament of the United Kingdom for County Limerick constituencies (1801–1922)
UK MPs 1852–1857
UK MPs 1857–1859
UK MPs 1859–1865
UK MPs 1868–1874
Irish Liberal Party MPs